Ziebell's handfish (Brachiopsilus ziebelli) is a rare Australian handfish in the genus Brachiopsilus. It is known only from eastern and southern Tasmania. Ziebell's handfish may possibly be extinct, as there have been no confirmed sightings since 2007.

 the species is listed as critically endangered on the IUCN Red List, and Vulnerable under Australia's Environment Protection and Biodiversity Conservation Act 1999 (EPBC Act). It is listed as Endangered under Tasmania's Threatened Species Protection Act 1995, and all handfish species are protected under the Tasmanian Living Marine Resources Management Act 1995, which prohibits their collection in State waters without a permit.

References 

Brachionichthyidae
Endemic fauna of Tasmania
Ziebell's handfish
Taxa named by Peter R. Last